The Brass River is one of the branches of the Nun River, which in turn is a branch of the Niger River, in the Niger Delta in Nigeria.
In the 19th century the river was an important trading route, first for slaves and later for palm oil. Brass River Crude Oil is named for a refinery on the river.

Name
The name "Brass" is European, said to have been given to the Nembe coastal villages because they traded for brass pans and neptunes to use for salt boiling.
The "Brass Ijo" were all the Ijaw people from Cape Formosa to the Santa Barbara River.
The name was used specifically for Twon village on the Brass river, the route to the Nembe capital in the interior.
In the 1884 and 1886 treaties "Brass" referred to the Nembe state.
The Brass river was also called the Rio Bento, or St. John river.

Course
The Brass River is a branch, or distributary, of the Nun River, which flows to the west.
The Brass leaves the east side of the Nun at Yenagoa and flows south to discharge into the Gulf of Guinea.
The tidal flats of the river have a reticulate drainage pattern, with higher elevation at the edges of the flats than at the center.
Discharge varies depending on the season and state of the tide:

An 1893 navigation guide says of the river,

The mouth of the river is protected by a sand bar, which in 1893 could not be crossed by vessels with more than  draft.
It was often used by merchant steamers trading on the Niger, since the entrance of the Brass was easier than that of the Nun. Many factories lay on the east shore of the Brass just inside the entrance, handling the extensive trade in palm oil and ivory.

The town of Twon-Brass lies near the mouth of the Brass River. This was a slaving port in the early 19th century, and later a collection point for palm oil and kernels.
In 2005 the Nigerian Agip Oil Company (NAOC)  was producing oil from 146 wells, and operated an export terminal at Brass River.
Brass River Crude Oil is a sweet medium light crude.

Early European exploration
In the 17th and 18th centuries the Portuguese controlled the Brass River, which was closed to British traders and was an outlet for shipping slaves to the Americas.
The town of Brass was inaccessible, reached only via the creeks.
After 1807 the British began trying to suppress the slave trade.
Don Pablo Frexas, in alliance with the chiefs of Brass and Bonny, was the main organizer of the river's slave trade.
James Holman visited the Guinea coast during his 1827−32 voyage round the world.
Holman observed that all the rivers between the Bonny and Cape Formosa communicate with each other in the interior, and all were navigable by canoes.
He wrote,

In June 1830 the explorer Richard Lemon Lander and this brother John reached Bussa on the Niger, the place where Mungo Park had died.
After exploring the region, they started down the Niger on 20 September 1830, and reached Brass Town on 14 November 1830.
Brass Town at this time was built on a large creek, which connected with the main Nun and Brass rivers by numerous winding rivulets.
An account of the journey says,

The banks were fringed with impenetrable mangroves.
On the return voyage they were assisted by a current running at  along the western shore.

Slave trade
An 1842 report to the British House of Commons said that "Slaves may be taken from the Bonny to the Brass River, and are taken there; the Brass River is not under King Peppel, and separate treaties must be made with the kings ... King Peppel seldom makes good his engagements, He may be concerned in the slave trade on the Brass River. There have been no slave vessels at Bonny since the treaty with King Peppel, and the trade in the creeks of the Brass River is much reduced."
The report included the testimony of Captain Gentle Brown, who said,

On 17 November 1856 Thomas Joseph Hutchinson, Her Britannic Majesty's Consul for the Bight of Biafra and the Island of Fernando Po, concluded a treaty with the kings of the territories adjacent to the Brass River. They agreed to stop the slave trade, and agreed on pilots' fees, duties and other terms of trade.
Hutchinson reported of a visit to Brass on 9 July 1857,

Later trade

In 1847 the new partnership of Stuart and Douglas bought a 282-ton barque, the Adriana, and sent it to the Brass River. Their agent was told to offer the local chiefs a share of the profits from palm oil trading on condition they stopped trading in slaves. This was the start of a lucrative new trade.
The prominent Nigerian journalist and nationalist John Payne Jackson at first wanted to be a merchant.
After traveling throughout West Africa, in the late 1860s he found work with the prominent Lagos merchant J. S. Leigh.
He was sent to the Brass River in the 1870s to manage Leigh's station there.
Jackson branched out into trading palm products on his own account, but was forced out of business by European competitors, an experience that may have affected his outlook towards Europeans.

S. A. Crowther, Bishop of Niger Territory, reported in 1885 that the native converts at Nembe, Brass River, had contributed towards building an iron church. It was opened on 9 October 1884 in presence of the congregation of 1,202 people. The congregation of St. Barnabas at Tawn, Brass River, had started to raise contributions for a similar iron church.

At one time the town of Twon-Brass was the main port of the Nembe Kingdom, called by one historian "the Venice of the Niger Delta", and was dominant in the palm oil trade of the region. When the Royal Niger Company became an increasingly strong rival in the trade, the town's economy was severely damaged.
In January 1895 the Nembe king William Koko led a dawn attack of more than a thousand warriors on the company's headquarters at Akassa, which triggered a retaliatory raid that destroyed the kingdom's inland capital of Nembe.
The British already had a consulate in Twon-Brass, from which after the fall of Koko they administered the area.

References

Sources

Niger River
Rivers of Nigeria
Bayelsa State